Marcus Dowtin (born January 22, 1989) is a former American football linebacker. Dowtin was signed by the New York Jets as an undrafted free agent in 2012. Dowtin played college football at Georgia before transferring to North Alabama during his senior year.

Dowtin has also been a member of the Philadelphia Eagles, Buffalo Bills, New York Giants, and Seattle Seahawks.

Early years
Dowtin attended Bishop McNamara High School in Maryland, and later Fork Union Military Academy High School. Dowtin was selected to the 2008 SuperPrep All-Mid-Atlantic team and Atlanta Journal-Constitution Super Southern 100. He was selected to the PrepStar All-Atlantic Region. He recorded 76 tackles, two sacks, three fumble recoveries and one interception in his senior season in 2007. He also had 1,202 rushing yards and 15 rushing touchdowns in high school as a running back. He was ranked 10th on State of Virginia Top 30 list and was ranked as the 7th best weakside linebacker in the nation by Scout.com.

College career
Dowtin played college football at the University of Georgia until he transferred to the University of North Alabama for his senior season.  On January 3, 2011, Dowtin was charged with second degree assault for his involvement in an altercation at a Maryland bar on May 29, 2010. On January 11, 2011, he was given an unconditional release by the University of Georgia.

In his freshman year, Dowtin played in 13 games in which he recorded 17 tackles and a forced fumble.

In his sophomore year, he played in 11 games and started 4 of them in which he recorded 57 tackles and 2 sacks. On September 5, 2009, in the season opener against Oklahoma State, Dowtin recorded 8 tackles but Georgia lost the game 24-10. On September 12, in a game against South Carolina, he recorded 6 tackles helping Georgia win 41-37. On September 19, he recorded 3 tackles and a pass deflection against Arkansas as Georgia won the game 52-41. In 2009, he was selected for the Col. Robert L. Jackson Family Scholarship.

In his junior year, Dowtin played in 11 games and started 2 games in which he recorded 57 tackles, 1.5 sacks and an interception for the season. He was a recipient of the Robert P. "Yunk" Ludwig Football Scholarship. On September 4, 2010, in a regular season game against Louisiana-Lafayette, Dowtin recorded 4 tackles as Georgia won by the score of 55-7. On September 11, he recorded 4 tackles against No. 24 ranked South Carolina but Georgia lost the game 17-6. On October 2, in a game against Colorado, Dowtin recorded 4 tackles, one sack and an interception but Georgia lost the game 29-27. On October 9, he recorded 3 tackles and 0.5 sack against Tennessee as Georgia won 41-14. On October 30, he had 10 tackles against Florida but the Georgia lost in overtime 34-31. On November 13, in a regular season game against No. 2 ranked Auburn, he recorded 10 tackles but Georgia lost 49-31.

In his senior year, he played at North Alabama. On September 1, he had 9 tackles, a forced fumble and an interception against Central Oklahoma contributing to North Alabama's 31-10 win. On September 10, he had 3 tackles and a half sack against Glenville State helping North Alabama win the game 48-21. On September 17, he had a team leading 10 tackles, 2 forced fumbles, a sack, a pass deflection against Abilene Christian. On November 12, in a game against Valdosta State, he had 10 tackles, 2 sacks and a forced fumble helping North Alabama win the game 30-23. He was named Defensive Player of the Week twice (9/5/2011, November 14, 2011).

Professional career

New York Jets
On April 30, 2012, Dowtin signed with the New York Jets as an undrafted free agent. On August 31, Dowtin was released on the day of final roster cuts. On September 1, Dowtin re-signed with the team to join the practice squad. On October 17, Dowtin was promoted to the active roster after the team released John Conner with an injury settlement. On October 21, he made his NFL debut against the New England Patriots. On November 2, Dowtin was fined $15,750 for unnecessary roughness on Miami Dolphins quarterback Matt Moore. On November 20, 2012, Dowtin was waived.

Philadelphia Eagles
Dowtin was signed to the Philadelphia Eagles' practice squad on December 24, 2012. He was released from his contract on April 11, 2013.

Buffalo Bills
Dowtin was claimed off waivers by the Buffalo Bills on April 12, 2013. On October 8, 2013, he was released.

New York Giants
On November 13, 2013, Dowtin was signed to the New York Giants' practice squad. On March 12, 2014, Dowtin was waived by the Giants.

Seattle Seahawks
Dowtin signed with the Seattle Seahawks on August 1, 2014. He was released on August 27, 2014.

Toronto Argonauts
On October 7, 2014, Dowtin was signed to the practice roster of the Toronto Argonauts. He was released by the Argonauts on November 11, 2014.

References

External links
 Georgia Bulldogs bio
 North Alabama Lions bio
 New York Jets bio
 Buffalo Bills bio
 Seattle Seahawks bio

1989 births
Living people
American football linebackers
Georgia Bulldogs football players
North Alabama Lions football players
New York Jets players
Philadelphia Eagles players
Buffalo Bills players
New York Giants players
Seattle Seahawks players
African-American players of American football
21st-century African-American sportspeople
20th-century African-American people